The Macau Mosque and Cemetery is the only mosque and Muslim cemetery in Macau, China, located in the parish of Nossa Senhora de Fátima.

History
It is believed that Macau Mosque was built by Muslims who arrived with the Portuguese army. Originally, these Muslims were recruited from South Asia by the army. Within the complex area, there are also Muslim cemetery with some of the tombs dated back for hundreds of years, indicating that Islam had arrived in Macau since hundreds of years ago.

In 1996, the IAM submitted a redevelopment plan of the mosque to Portuguese Macau government but was not approved. To accommodate the increasing number of Muslims in Macau, in 2006 the IAM applied for government permission to build a new larger mosque in area adjacent to the current mosque building. In the late months of 2007, Macau Mosque underwent renovation.

In the future, the new mosque is planned to be double in size to be a more modern mosque for Macau with a total area of 1,881 m2, 50 meters high and can accommodate up to 600 worshipers. An Islamic center, cheap Halal restaurant, 30-room hostel and classroom and 127-meter high 38-story residential building will also be constructed.

During the COVID-19 pandemic, the Government of Macau ordered the mosque to be closed for one month.

Architecture
The Macau Mosque and Cemetery area consists of Macau Mosque, extended area of the mosque, Macau Muslim cemetery, headquarters of the Islamic Association of Macau, ablution place, badminton court and playground. The size of Macau Mosque is around 6.5 meter x 12 meter which can accommodate around 100 worshipers. The Macau Mosque and Cemetery entrance gate was donated by Halima binti Sheik on 27 June 1973 in the memory of Adam Sheik.

Activities

Macau Mosque houses the headquarters of the Islamic Association of Macau (IAM; ; Portuguese: Associação Islâmica de Macau), which manages the daily operation of the mosque. The association was founded in 1935 in Portuguese Macau. The association is financially assisted by the Islamic Union of Hong Kong in Hong Kong.

More people visit the mosque on Sunday during their off days due to their tight working schedule in the weekdays or for wedding and during big Islamic festivities, such as Eid al-Adha. Most of them do the Quran reading or Islamic studies activities. During Eid al-Adha, the Muslims sacrifice cows and slaughter them at the Macau Slaughter House.

Transportation
In the future, Macau Mosque and Cemetery will be served from Zona do Nordeste Station of the Macau LRT. However, the LRT Macau Line project has been put on hold.

See also
 Islam in Macau
 Islam in China

References

External links

 Islam in Macau
 

1980 establishments in Macau
20th-century mosques
Cemeteries in Macau
Islam in Macau
Mosques completed in 1980
Mosques in China
Religious buildings and structures in Macau
Sunni cemeteries